Charles Royal Johnson (born January 28, 1948) is an American mathematician specializing in linear algebra. He is a Class of 1961 professor of mathematics at College of William and Mary. The books Matrix Analysis and Topics in Matrix Analysis, co-written by him with Roger Horn, are standard texts in advanced linear algebra.

Career 
Charles R. Johnson received a B.A. with distinction in Mathematics and Economics from Northwestern University in 1969. In 1972, he received a Ph.D. in Mathematics and Economics from the California Institute of Technology, where he was advised by Olga Taussky Todd; his dissertation was entitled "Matrices whose Hermitian Part is Positive Definite". Johnson held various professorships over ten years at the University of Maryland, College Park starting in 1974. He was a professor at Clemson University from 1984 to 1987. In 1987, he became a professor of mathematics at the College of William and Mary, where he remains today.

Books 
  (1st edition 1985)
  
  (1st edition 1991)

as editor

References

External links 
 
 Charles Royal Johnson Curriculum Vitae

20th-century American mathematicians
21st-century American mathematicians
College of William & Mary faculty
Northwestern University alumni
California Institute of Technology alumni
1948 births
Living people
Linear algebraists